STV Sports Centre was a Scottish regional sports stand, covering the two STV franchise areas of Northern and Central Scotland. The strand was produced the STV News department in Glasgow (STV Central), with contributions from STV North's news team in Aberdeen.

Until May 2011, Sports Centre aired two different programmes: Friday Night Football, broadcast on Friday nights at 10:30pm, and Magners League Rugby – airing on Sundays straight after the late ITV News bulletin. Short Sports Centre news bulletins also aired on Monday – Thursday nights at 10:35pm during the late regional bulletins from STV News.

The first series of STV Sports Centre, launched just two years after the long-running Scotsport was axed, featured interviews, special reports, analysis, a preview of the weekend's football and competitions. Gerry McCulloch and Sheelagh McLaren were the main co-hosts, Stefani Dailly and Chris Harvey acted as relief presenters in their absence.

Friday Night Football
The Friday night programme was relaunched on 13 August 2010 as the hour-long Friday Night Football, focusing on previews and analysis of the Clydesdale Bank Scottish Premier League and featuring action from midweek UEFA Champions League and Europa League fixtures. The series was introduced as part of a two-year production and archive services deal between STV and the SPL.

A few weeks into the new series, STV decided to shorten the programme to the original 30 minutes. The programme was axed in June 2011.

Sports Centre Rugby
Sports Centre Rugby was broadcast on Sunday nights after the late ITV News bulletin. It featured highlights from the weekend's Celtic League games with extended coverage of matches involving Glasgow Warriors and Edinburgh Rugby. Originally broadcast as STV Rugby, the programme was introduced in September 2009 after a deal was reached between the Celtic League Association, Scottish Rugby and STV, following the closure of Setanta Sports' UK operations. The Sports Centre strand was discontinued in 2011, with highlights of the new 2011–12 rugby season, now known as Pro12 airing under the STV Rugby banner once again.

References

External links

2010 Scottish television series debuts
2011 Scottish television series endings
2010s Scottish television series
ITV Sport
Sports television in Scotland
STV News
2010s British sports television series